Talaat Youssef is an Egyptian former football player. He last managed Al Ittihad in the Egyptian Premier League.

Playing career

El Ittihad El Sakandary
Youssef is considered one of El Ittihad El Sakandary's (aka Alexandria Union) best and best-known players. He helped his team gain their latest trophy by scoring the winning goal against Al Ahly Cairo in 1976 Egyptian Football Cup. Youssef's loosely tied boot flew into the net as he shot the winning goal, which confused Al Ahly's goal keeper; Ekramy.

Managerial career

El Ittihad El Sakandary
Youssef not only led Al-Ittihad Al-Sakndary (aka Alexandria Union) to avoid relegation in 2004–05 Egyptian Premier League, but the team reached the 2004-05 Egyptian Football Cup Final game under his management. Although the team lost 0–1 to ENPPI after extra-time, it qualified for the 2006 CAF Confederation Cup because ENPPI qualified to the 2006 CAF Champions League. Al-Ittihad Al-Sakndary was eventually eliminated in the second round after losing to Tunisia's Espérance via Penalty shootout. Both teams had exchanged a 1–0 win on its home ground.

El Geish
In June 2006, El Geish appointed Youssef as its new manager after his successful spell at Alexandria. He succeeded former coach Hassan Megahed, who died earlier that year. Youssef enjoyed a successful career with El Geish. He led the team to fourth position in 2007–08 Egyptian Premier League, and to semi-finals in 2007–08 Arab Champions League.

Ittihad El-Shorta
Youssed then moved to newly promoted Ittihad El-Shorta. He became the highest-paid local manager at the Egyptian Premier League with a monthly wage of EGP 70,000 according to some reports. He extended his contract for an extra season in May 2010.

El Ittihad El Sakandary
He took over the training of the Arab Contractors Club on June 11, 2019, to succeed Helmy Toulan, started with a caretaker role, then signed a long contract. On 12 October 2020, he resigned from coaching El Ittihad.

Managerial statistics

Honours

Manager
Libyan Premier League:
Winner in 2013–14 Libyan Premier League with Al Ahli SC (Tripoli)

References

External links
 

Egyptian footballers
Egyptian football managers
1955 births
Living people
Sportspeople from Alexandria
Expatriate football managers in Libya
Al Ittihad Alexandria Club managers
Al Masry SC managers
Al Mokawloon Al Arab SC managers
Smouha SC managers
Association footballers not categorized by position